This is a list of public holidays in the Federated States of Micronesia.

References

 
Micronesia
Society of the Federated States of Micronesia
Federated States of Micronesia